The Holder Formation is a geologic formation in the Sacramento Mountains of New Mexico. It preserves fossils dating back to the late Pennsylvanian.

Description
The Holder Formation consists of limestone, red and gray calcareous shale, sandstone, and conglomerate. The formation overlies the Beeman Formation and is overlain by the Laborcita Formation.

The formation is interpreted as a shallow-shelf marine formation of Virgilian (latest Pennsylvanian) age during a global ice age.

Fossils
Bioherms are present at the base of the formation. They are composed of uncalcified cup-shaped phylloid (leaf-like) algae surrounded by masses of beresellid algae.

History of investigation
The unit was first named by Lloyd C. Pray in 1954 and a type section was designated in 1959. Pray originally assigned the formation to the Magdalena Group, but the Magdalena Group has subsequently been abandoned.

See also

 List of fossiliferous stratigraphic units in New Mexico
 Paleontology in New Mexico

Footnotes

References
 
 
 
 
 
 

Carboniferous formations of New Mexico
Carboniferous southern paleotropical deposits